G7th Ltd of Peterborough, England, is a manufacturer of guitar capos.

The first G7th "Performance" capo was launched in April 2004. The capos have won numerous awards for the design of the capo (Design Week), Players' Award (Acoustic Guitar mag) and many other accolades. In 2009, the Company won the prestigious Queen's Award for Enterprise and the founders were invited to Buckingham Palace, London, to meet the Queen.

The "Performance 2" capo was launched in 2014 to excellent reviews, and went on to win the 2014 Player's Choice Award for capos in Acoustic Guitar (magazine), the third win in a row for G7th.

As of 2017 there are  5 distinct ranges of G7th Capos: Heritage, Performance, Newport, Nashville and Ultralight.

G7th capos are used by many professional musicians including Richard Thompson, Bryan Adams, The Kooks, KT Tunstall, Marcus Mumford, Roger McGuinn, Catfish and the Bottlemen. Blues musician Eric Clapton, used one on his DVD "Sessions for Robert Johnson".

References

External links
Official G7th Website

Guitar parts and accessories